Xenias may refer to:

Xenias of Arcadia, also Xenias of Parrhasia, a general who commanded mercenaries in the service of Cyrus the Younger 
Xenias of Elis, an Elean of great wealth, who was a proxenos of Sparta